The 6 Hours of Fuji (formerly the Fuji 1000 Kilometres) is a sports car race held at Fuji Speedway in Oyama, Shizuoka, Japan. The race was held for the first time in 1967, and in 1977 became part of the new Fuji Long Distance Series. In 1982 a second 1000 km race known as WEC in Japan was run as a round of the World Sportscar Championship.  The All Japan Sports Prototype Championship was formed in 1983, and since then co-sanctioned this event. The World Championship left after 1988, but the JSPC carried on both races until 1992.  The race was revived in 1999 as an attempt to gauge interest in an Asian Le Mans Series; the series never materialized. The race was revived again as a part of the short-lived Japan Le Mans Challenge in 2007. The race returned again as part of the 2012 FIA World Endurance Championship season, but changed to a 6-hour race, with no distance limit.

Results

Fuji 1000 km / 6 Hours of Fuji

NOTE:  The 2013 race did not start;  all 17 laps were run under the Safety Car.  A subsequent rule change was implemented to mandate two green flag laps before a race counted.

Records

Wins by constructor

Wins by engine manufacturer

Drivers with multiple wins

WEC in Japan / Interchallenge Fuji

 The 1985 race was stopped after 2 hours due to heavy rain.  Most of the international entries withdrew before the race, or in the early laps.

External links

6 Hours of Fuji official website
Racing Sports Cars: Fuji archive

 
Recurring sporting events established in 1982
1982 establishments in Japan